Dan Man is the stage name of Belizean entertainer Allison Hemsley. Hemsley (born 1973 in Belize City) is a local musician and rapper and actor. He received national attention after starring in the television series Noh Matta Wat!.

References

1973 births
Living people
People from Belize City
Belizean musicians
Belizean composers
Male composers
Belizean media personalities
Belizean Rastafarians